The Fulton–Nassau Historic District is a federally designated historic area of New York City roughly bounded by Broadway and Park Row, Nassau, Dutch and William Streets, Ann and Spruce Streets, and Liberty Street, in lower Manhattan. It contains a mix of late 19th- and early 20th-century architectural styles. The historic district lies just south of City Hall Park and east of lower Broadway.  It is a historic district listed on the National Register of Historic Places.

Contained within the 10 block  area of the Fulton–Nassau Historic District are eight individual New York City designated landmarks, including 63 Nassau Street, the Keuffel & Esser Company Building, the Bennett Building, the Corbin Building, the Temple Court Building (5 Beekman Street), the Potter Building (35-38 Park Row), the Morse Building (140 Nassau Street), the New York Times Building (41 Park Row), and 150 Nassau Street.

See also
National Register of Historic Places listings in Manhattan below 14th Street
List of New York City Designated Landmarks in Manhattan

References
Notes

Citations

Financial District, Manhattan
Historic districts on the National Register of Historic Places in Manhattan
Late 19th and Early 20th Century American Movements architecture
Historic districts in Lower Manhattan